Folmer is a surname. Notable people with the surname include:

Françoise Folmer (born 1961), Luxembourgish architect and politician
Louis H. Folmer (1904–1983), American politician
Mike Folmer (born 1956), American politician and convicted sex offender
Richard Folmer ( 1942–2022), American actor